Timothy Smithers (born 22 January 1956 in Ramsgate) is an English former professional footballer who played in the Football League, as a left back.

References

1956 births
Living people
People from Ramsgate
English footballers
Association football defenders
Nuneaton Borough F.C. players
Oxford United F.C. players
Atherstone Town F.C. players
Bedworth United F.C. players
Rugby Town F.C. players
English Football League players